Marcelino "Marcy" Valdez Arellano II (born May 25, 1986) is a Filipino professional basketball player for the Manila City Stars of the Pilipinas Super League. From 2005 to 2009, he played in the PBL. Earlier, he played collegiate basketball in the University of the East where he was a Rookie of the Year recipient in season 67.

References

1986 births
Living people
Barako Bull Energy players
Filipino men's basketball players
Point guards
Rain or Shine Elasto Painters players
Basketball players from Manila
UE Red Warriors basketball players
Tagalog people
Maharlika Pilipinas Basketball League players
Rain or Shine Elasto Painters draft picks